Richard Hayward (1892–1964) was a British film actor, writer and musician.

Life and career
Born in Southport, Lancashire, his family moved to Ireland when he was a baby. Hayward was an enthusiast for all Ulster regional popular culture. He was a member of the Orange Order, to which he dedicated much time. After a period working at the Gaiety Theatre, Dublin he helped form the Belfast Repertory Theatre Company. He was a popular singer in the forties and fifties. His career meant he lived a typical theatrical lifestyle being constantly on the move.

Hayward wrote a number of travel books about Ireland, exploring every county. He was closely associated with the Belfast Naturalists' Field Club, serving as its president in 1951.

Death
He died due to a road accident outside Ballymena, in October 1964.

Selected filmography
 Flame in the Heather (1935) - Fassiefern
 The Voice of Ireland (1936)
 The Early Bird (1936) - Daniel Duff
 The Luck of the Irish (1936) - Sam Mulhern
 Shipmates o' Mine (1936) - Mike Dooley
 Devil's Rock (1938) - Sam Mulhern
 Irish and Proud of It (1938) - Donogh O'Connor
 A Night to Remember (1958) - Victualling Officer (final film role)

Hayward also wrote the screenplay of the musical drama Devil's Rock.

Selected books

He wrote a number of books, mostly topographical, about Ireland, including:

In praise of Ulster (Arthur Barker, 1938)
Where the Shannon flows (1940)
Corrib Country (Dundalgan Press, 1943)
In the Kingdom of Kerry (Dundalgan Press, 1946)
Leinster and the city of Dublin (Arthur Barker, 1949)
Ulster and the City of Belfast (Arthur Barker, 1950)
Belfast through the ages (Dundalgan Press, 1952)
Connacht and the city of Galway (Arthur Barker, 1952)
Story of the Irish Harp (Arthur Guinness, Son & Co., 1954)
Mayo, Sligo, Leitrim & Roscommon (Arthur Barker, 1955)
Munster and the city of Cork (Phoenix House, 1964)

References

Further reading
 Paul Clements, Romancing Ireland: Richard Hayward, 1892-1964, Dublin: The Lilliput Press, 2014.

External links
 Remembering Richard Hayward at NIDirect.
 Remembering Richard Hayward: An evening of music, story and film at antrimhistory.net
 Richard Hayward (1892-1964): Actor And Writer, at Dictionary of Ulster Biography
 An Irishman’s Diary on the celebrated Richard Hayward
 Actor and writer who helped define the Ireland of his time: Romancing Ireland
 Reportage: The story of a forgotten Irish legend at Belfast Telegraph
 Richard Hayward: Exploring the life of a pivotal cultural figure at BBC
 

British male film actors
1892 births
1964 deaths
British male stage actors
20th-century British male actors
20th-century British male writers
20th-century British male singers